Lysinibacillus capsici is a Gram-positive, strictly aerobic, rod-shaped, endospore-forming and motile bacterium from the genus of Lysinibacillus which has been isolated from rhizospheric soil of a pepper plant.

References

Bacillaceae
Bacteria described in 2019